Hertel Wax is an American company which produces ski wax, snowboard wax, skate wax and accessories. The company is owned by Terry Hertel and is based in Sunnyvale, California.

Terry Hertel founded the company in California in 1972; Hertel Wax was the first producer of all-temperature ski and snowboard waxes. The company approach was to micro-encapsulate tiny water-soluble surfactants into the wax. 

The company holds a patent on the first fluorocarbon waxes, introduced in 1986.

References

External links 
Official site
 "A short history of ski wax": Article by Seth Masia
 
American companies established in 1972
Companies based in Sunnyvale, California